Passport to Latin America is a television show on the Travel Channel hosted by television host Samantha Brown and includes tours of Latin America. A successor to Brown's Passport to Europe series, in Passport to Latin America she tours cities of Latin America such as Mexico City, Rio de Janeiro, and Buenos Aires and interacts with the town's locals.  She also visits local landmarks, including popular restaurants and shopping locales, and educates viewers on events in the city's history.

The series premiered on June 6, 2007.

Episodes
 Belize
 Buenos Aires, Argentina
 Central Valley, Costa Rica
 Coastal Chile
 Cusco, Peru
 Granada, Nicaragua
 Guadalajara, Mexico
 Guanacaste, Costa Rica
 Honduras
 Machu Picchu, Peru
 Mexico City, Mexico
 Montevideo, Uruguay
 Panama City, Panama
 Punta Arenas, Chile
 Quito, Ecuador
 Rio de Janeiro, Brazil
 Santiago, Chile
 São Paulo, Brazil
 Zihuatanejo & Ixtapa, Mexico

See also
 Samantha Brown
 Travel Channel
 Passport to Europe
 Great Hotels
 Latin America

References

External links
 Official Show Website.

Travel Channel original programming